Telemundo Africa is an African cable television channel broadcast on 12 August 2013 by DStv in more than 48 countries in sub-Saharan Africa. Owned by NBCUniversal International Networks, the channel programming is dedicated to the Spanish-language telenovelas produced by Telemundo Television Studios. The channel is available in English and Portuguese.

Overview
Telemundo Africa is only available for the African market, with Spanish-language programming dubbing in English for the countries of South Africa and Sub-Saharan Africa, and in Portuguese for Angola and Mozambique. The dubbing in Portuguese is done in Miami by the studios The Kitchen and Universal Cinergia Dubbing. The dubbing in English is done in South Africa by MultiChoice. When the channel began its broadcasts in August 2013, it began to show the telenovelas Aurora, Rosa diamante, Mi corazón insiste en Lola Volcán and La casa de al lado.

From April 2021, the channel started airing all their shows 7 days a week similar to other channels such as Zee World, Star Life and Novela Magic.

References

External links
 

Telemundo
Television channels and stations established in 2013